Barfi! is a 2012 Indian romantic comedy-drama film written and directed by Anurag Basu and produced by UTV Motion Pictures. The film features Ranbir Kapoor, Priyanka Chopra, and Ileana D'Cruz in the lead roles, with Saurabh Shukla, Ashish Vidyarthi, and Roopa Ganguly playing supporting roles. The screenplay which incorporates a nonlinear narrative was co-written by Basu with his wife Tani. Pritam Chakraborty composed the musical and background score while Akiv Ali edited the film, with the cinematography provided by Ravi Varman. Set between 1972 and 2012, the film narrates the story of the title character from Darjeeling and his relationships with two women, Shruti and the autistic Jhilmil.

It was a major commercial success, grossing  at the box office. Barfi! has received various awards and nominations, with praise for its direction, the cast's performances, cinematography, screenplay, musical score, costume and production design. As of June 2015, the film has won 70 awards.

At the 58th Filmfare Awards, Barfi! received the most nominations (thirteen), winning a leading seven awards, including Best Film and Best Actor for Kapoor. It received sixteen nominations at the 2012 Star Guild Awards and won eight awards, including the Best Film and Best Director. The film received twenty-three nominations at the 19th Screen Awards, winning nine awards, including Best Director for Basu and Best Actor for Kapoor. At the 14th IIFA Awards, it won fourteen awards, out of twenty-one nominations, including the Best Film and Best Director. At the 14th Zee Cine Awards, Barfi! received nine awards, including Best Film, Best Director for Basu and Best Actress for Chopra.

Accolades

See also
 List of Bollywood films of 2012

Footnotes

References

External links
Awards for Barfi! at the Internet Movie Database

Lists of accolades by Indian film